, also known as Morimura Seiichi no Shūchakueki, is a long-running prime-time television detective drama series in Japan that first aired on TV Asahi in 1990. Based on Seiichi Morimura's Ushiokeiji no Jikenbo series.

Shigeru Tsuyuguchi played the lead role in the first four episodes, Tsurutaro Kataoka has been playing the lead role since the fifth episode. Masanao Ushio is a detective of Nishi Shinjuku Police station, his nickname is Moo-san. He solves incidents with his great insight and intelligence.

Some episodes have aired on KIKU with English subtitles.

Cast
 Shigeru Tsuyuguchi as Masanao Ushio (Episode 1–4)
 Gen Kimura as Hirabayashi (Episode 1–4)
 Tsurutaro Kataoka as Masanao Ushio (Episode 5-38)
 Kumiko Okae as Sumiyo Ushio (Episode 7-36)
 Akira Nagoya as Sakamoto (Episode 5, 7–17)
 Taisaku Akino as Sakamoto (Episode 17-38)

Episodes

Shigeru Tsuyuguchi as Masanao Ushio (1990-94) 
1. Shūressha (December 8, 1990); Susumu Kurobe as Onaka Kazuyuki, Naoya Makoto as Detective Haraguchi, Tadashi Yokouchi as Mogami Hideyuki
2. Shūchakueki (February 1, 1992); Tōru Minegishi as Mizuma Tasuhiko, Eiichiro Funakoshi as Kurasaki Shinya, Hiro Komura as Miyasaka Yukiko
3. Shikeidai no Butai (November 7, 1992); Yoko Moriguchi as Igusa Mamiko, Kenichi Endō as Iba Hiroshi
4. Ao no Jūjika (September 24, 1994); Yu-ki Matsumura as Nagumo Hirotada, Takako Miki as Yabuki Asako

Tsurutaro Kataoka as Masanao Ushio (1996-now) 
5. Hokoriaru Higaisha (January 27, 1996)
6. Ningeno no Jūjika (September 28, 1996)
7. Machi (March 22, 1997)
8. Mado (March 28, 1998)
9. Eki (November 28, 1998); Kei Ishibashi as Aoyama Sachi, Momiji Yamamura as Tsutsumi Yoshiko
10. Murder of a Flower-Viewing Guest (March 27, 1999); Minako Tanaka as Nagasaki Minako, Takanori Higuchi as Nagasaki Shinsuke
11. Murder Credit (August 28, 1999)
12. Yako Ressha (February 5, 2000)
13. Satsujin no Funin (January 13, 2001); Satoko Takemoto as Ashita Megumi
14. Sabaku no Anshō (September 22, 2001); Naomi Hosokawa as Michiyuki Yumiko, Masanori Ikeda as Kanda Naoya
15. Sabaku no Eki (February 8, 2003)
16. Kabe no Me (July 5, 2003)
17. Muteki no Yoin (October 2, 2004); Takami Yoshimoto as Erimura Tazuko and Shizuko,
18. Hakon no Jōken (August 20, 2005); Mami Nomura as Satomi Masae, Satoshi Jinbo as Nakanishi Mitsuhiko
19. Shisha no Haitatsunin (March 25, 2006)
20. Sabaku no Kissaten (October 28, 2006); Ryoko Yuui as Obana Fujie, Bengal as Jibiki, Takeo Nakahara as Inaba
21. Aku no Jōken (September 22, 2007)

22. Satsujin Doumei (March 14, 2009); Atsuko Sakurai as Takabayashi Yuko
23. Shisa-ji (October 10, 2009); Kaori Takahashi as Niki Seiko, Hiromi Nakajima as Yanagawa Naomi
24. Shūchakueki (July 31, 2010); Noriko Aoyama as Mikami Junko, Yuko Takayama as Miyaji Yukiko, Masahiro Komoto as Mizuma Tatsuhiko
25. Tochū Gesha Suru Onna (September 24, 2011)
26. Satsui no Honryu (October 27, 2012); Natsuki Harada as Izawa Miho, Kazuya Takahashi as Chiba Ryugo
27. Akuno Tamashii (September 28, 2013); Sayuri Kokushō as Kawana Megumi
28. Zankokuna Shikai (June 28, 2014)
29. Umbrella of Goodwill - Murderer on a Rainy Night!! A Husband was Murdered!? (2015); Riona Hazuki as Yamano Kyoko
30. Murder Credit - Victim's Pandora's Box!! Unsolved Murder Under the Lake... (2016); Sei Matobu as Munakata Ayuko, Gamon Kaai as Okamoto Hiroshi
31. Murder of a Flower-Viewing Guest (July 16, 2017); Kanan Nakahara as Kunugi Shizuka, Yasufumi Hayashi as Nagasaki Shinsuke
32. Satsui wo Hakobu Kutsu (April 22, 2018); Jun Hashizume as Shimojo Tamotsu, Yōko Ishino as Shimojo Kanako
33. Garasu no Mihitsu (June 24, 2018); Tomoka Kurotani as Ayane
34. Koya no Shoumei (January 27, 2019); Reiko Takashima as Sekikawa Kyoko, Shunsuke Nakamura as Yamana Isao, Hideko Hara as Wakita Fuyue
35. Kishibo no Matsuei (November 3, 2019)
36. Yuki no Hotaru (January 7, 2020); Yoko Moriguchi as Eiko Izumida, Maki Miyamoto as Shimamura Masako, Ichirota Miyakawa as Izumida Yozo
37. Teinennonai Satsui (April 1, 2021); Toshinori Omi as Iba Teiji
38. Jugatsu no Tulip (December 22, 2022); Rie Mimura as Kitano Eiko, Sei Hiraizumi as Tashiro, Moemi Katayama as Kono Megumi

Notes

References

1990 Japanese television series debuts
2022 Japanese television series endings
Japanese drama television series
Japanese detective television drama series
Japanese crime television series
Tokyo Metropolitan Police Department in fiction